The Russian Trading System (RTS) was a stock market that operated in Moscow from 1995 to 2011. It was established in September 1995 to consolidate various regional trading floors into one exchange. In December 2011 it merged with Moscow Interbank Currency Exchange (MICEX), creating Moscow Exchange. Originally RTS was modeled on NASDAQ's trading and settlement software; in 1998 the exchange went on line with its own in-house system.  Initially created as a non-profit organisation, it was transformed into a joint-stock company.

RTS Index

The RTS Index (RTSI) was first calculated on September 1, 1995. It is now the official indicator of Moscow Exchange. The RTSI is a capitalization-weighted composite index calculated based on prices of the 50 most liquid Russian stocks. The Index is calculated in real time and denominated in US dollars. 

The RTS Index (RTSI) reached its highest point at 2,498.10 on 19 May 2008 (closing price: 2,487.92), which was during the global financial crisis of 2008.

Companies based in Moscow
Financial services companies of Russia
Futures exchanges
Stock exchanges in Russia
Financial services companies established in 1995
1995 establishments in Russia
Former electronic trading platforms
Defunct stock exchanges